The Fiat Strada is a supermini coupé utility produced by the Italian manufacturer Fiat since 1998. It is based on Fiat's world car "project 178", the Palio. It is produced by Fiat Automóveis in Brazil, and has been marketed worldwide, excluding the United States and Canada. In Europe the Strada was sold by Fiat Professional division.

First generation (Tipo 278; 1998-2021) 
Launched in 1998 in Brazil, it was the cargo member of the "178 Project". The Strada was made to replace the Fiat City, a pickup version of the Fiorino, a commercial derivative of the Fiat Uno.
In Europe the Strada was launched in April 1999 with two engine: the 1.2 Fire petrol with 73 hp and the 1.7 turbodiesel with 70 hp.

2001 revision 
In 2001, the model had its first facelift. The new design was made by the Italian design guru Giorgetto Giugiaro. The facelift included a new front and interior. The Mark II series marked the début of an extended-cab version. In 2002, Fiat do Brasil launched the first version of a Fiat Strada Adventure, with "off-road" looks.

2004 revision 
The new Mark III was launched in 2004. It has a revised front and interior design taken from the Palio (and also designed by Giorgetto Giugiaro). Also, a second version of the Strada Adventure was built, with the same features of the Weekend Adventure. It was offered in Europe with the relatively modern 1.9-L JTD diesel engine.

In South Africa, the Strada is offered in four variants: 1.2 Fire MPI EL, 1.6 Torque MPI EL, 1.6 Torque MPI ELX (same as the EL but with colour-coded bumpers and mirrors, electric windows, driver's airbag, and air conditioning), and 1.7 turbo diesel EL. This model is available in two models, the standard X-Space and the X-Space Adventure (which has similar specifications to the standard 1.6 ELX model). Both X-Space models are powered by the 1.4 Fire MPI engine.

In Europe, it is available only with the 1.3 Multijet 16V diesel engine with 85 PS and Euro 4 standard emission level.

2009–2013 
Unveiled in summer 2009, the all-new Mark IV model was put on sale in the end of 2009. Whilst the model shares its name with the previous Strada, a large number of its components are new, including a new bodyshell. For the rest of the South America, the new Strada was introduced in mid-2010. The design is inspired by the Fiat Grande Punto with many elements similar to the latest versions of the family Palio and Siena. The fourth-generation Strada is built in four different versions: Working, the basic version, Trekking, with more goodies, the Sporting for sportier style with aero kit body style, and the Adventure with a locking differential dedicated to off-road use. In 2010, Fiat do Brazil introduced a new double-cab version (also called Strada Cabina Dupla) with four seats, but maintaining the same wheelbase.

The engines used are the Fiat 1.4-L 16V Fire Flex (85 PS) and the 1.8-L 16-V Ecotec Flex (114 PS).

The Strada was relaunched for Italy and other selected European markets in 2012.

2013–present 

At the end of 2013, Fiat unveiled the latest facelift of the Strada (as a model year 2014) based on the 2009 version. The new Strada introduced a new front fascia and new rear lights, and the double-cab version is available with the suicide-style rear doors. Three versions are sold in South America: Working, Trekking and Adventure with four different body styles.

For the 2015 model year, the Fiat Strada was rebadged by Ram Trucks for the Mexican market as the Ram 700.

In 2018, total sales of the Strada in the Brazilian market surpassed 1.4 million of units.

Second generation (Tipo 281; 2020-present) 

The second generation of the Fiat Strada (codeproject 281) was presented on June 26, 2020, in Brazil and is based on the new MC-P modular platform derived from the Fiat Argo with the front MacPherson suspension and part of the cabin taken from the Fiat Mobi model and the rear suspension taken from the Brazilian Fiat Fiorino (327).
For the first time the Strada was produced in the double cab 4-door version with 5-seats.

The second generation of Strada introduce the large silver-colored Fiat front logo replacing the previous one, a small Italian flag inserted in the grid and LED light clusters. The interior reproduces some of the contents of the Fiat Uno (327) produced in Brazil, even if some secondary controls are modified. In addition to the display at the center of the instrumentation, there is also an UConnect 5 infotainment with 7-inch touchscreen, bluetooth, wireless, compatible with Apple CarPlay and Android Auto.

Starting on 18 November 2020, the rebadged RAM 700 saw a new generation for the Mexican market. It is offered in the SLT (regular and crew cab), Bighorn, and Laramie trim levels.

Engine 
The range of engines consist in the 1.4 Fire Flex 8 valve (85 HP petrol and 88 HP ethanol) of the Endurace versions and the 1.3 Firefly Flex 8 valve (101 HP petrol and 109 HP ethanol) of the Freedom,  Volcano and ranch, both with the five-speed manual gearbox gears and simulated 7-speed cvt-type automatic transmission and the E-Locker traction control system.

Safety
The Strada has ventilated front disc brakes and drum brakes in the rear.

Latin NCAP
The Latin American Strada with airbag switch, UN127, and ESC received 1 star from Latin NCAP in 2022 under its new protocol (similar to Euro NCAP 2014).

Gallery

Sales

See also 

 Fiat Ritmo — an earlier Fiat car which was sold as the "Strada" in some markets
 Fiat Palio — the recent Strada's base car
 Fiat Albea
 Fiat Siena

References

External links 

 Brazilian official website

Strada
Coupé utilities
Flexible-fuel vehicles
2000s cars
2010s cars
Cars of Brazil
Front-wheel-drive vehicles
Cars introduced in 1998